Gnorimoschema shepherdiae is a moth in the family Gelechiidae. It was described by Ronald J. Priest in 2014. It is found in North America, where it has been recorded from Alberta, British Columbia, Manitoba, Michigan, Quebec and Yukon.

The length of the forewings is 5−6.3 mm. The forewings are brown intermixed with white and a few greyish-orange scales, as well as three suffused white bands, alternating with three bands of the ground colour from the base to two-thirds. The distal one-third is mostly white intermixed with white scales tipped with brown and brown scales, as well as a few greyish-orange scales. The hindwings are pale brown.

The larvae feed on Shepherdia canadensis. They mine the leaves of their host plant.

References

Gnorimoschema
Moths described in 2014